Polonne is a city on the Khomora River in Shepetivka Raion, Khmelnytskyi Oblast (province) of western Ukraine. Polonne hosts the administration of Polonne urban hromada, one of the hromadas of Ukraine. The current estimated population is 

Polonne is situated on the Shepetivka-Berdychiv railroad line. Various industries within the city include porcelain, ceramic.

History
Polonne has been known at least since 996, when it was first mentioned as a taxation subject in relation to Prince Volodymyr the Great's Desyatynna Church. Throughout the Middle Ages Polonne was known by its castle, also enjoying Magdeburg Rights. In 1648 Jews (including the well-known Samson ben Pesah Ostropoli) who had taken refuge within the town's walls were massacred by the troops of Bohdan Khmelnytsky.

In Modern times received city status since 1938.

The Jewish population was important in the town. During World War II, the Germans occupied the town kept the Jews imprisoned in a ghetto. They were guarded by Ukrainian policemen and had to do slave labor. In 1941 and 1942, hundreds of Jews are murdered in mass executions perpetrated by an Einsatzgruppe.

Until 18 July 2020, Polonne was the administrative center of Polonne Raion. The raion was abolished in July 2020 as part of the administrative reform of Ukraine, which reduced the number of raions of Khmelnytskyi Oblast to three. The area of Polonne Raion was merged into Shepetivka Raion.

Notable people
Peretz Markish (1895–1952), poet. A museum is dedicated to him in the old synagogue.
Leo Mol (1915–2009), Canadian sculptor
Isaiah Leo Sharfman (1886–1969), American economist

Gallery

References

External links
 History of Jewish Community in Polonnoye

Cities in Khmelnytskyi Oblast
Volhynian Governorate
Shtetls
Cities of district significance in Ukraine
Holocaust locations in Ukraine